Benigno Montoya Muñoz (1865 – 1929) was a Mexican architect, sculptor and painter.

References

19th-century Mexican painters
Mexican male painters
20th-century Mexican painters
Mexican architects
Mexican sculptors
Male sculptors
People from Zacatecas
20th-century sculptors
19th-century sculptors
1865 births
1929 deaths
19th-century Mexican male artists
20th-century Mexican male artists